In stage lighting, an ellipsoidal reflector floodlight (sometimes known by the acronym ERF which is often pronounced "erf"), better known as a scoop, is a large, simple lighting fixture with a dome-like reflector, large high-wattage lamp and no lens. It consists almost entirely of a lamp in the center of a big curved metal (or plastic lined with reflective foil) dome that acts as a reflector. The result is a wide, soft-edged pool of light good for general lighting. However, since scoop lights do not have a mechanism for cutting down the size of their beam, they are rarely used for more specific lighting needs.

Many theaters use scoop lights for worklights, rehearsals, non-performance times, and certain performance times. Scoops can be used to mimic the effect of a striplight to illuminate a cyclorama. They are easy to set up and take down, are relatively inexpensive, typically have long lamp life.  When used as worklights, scoop lights frequently don't require the use of the light board to operate.

Scoop lights are also used for flooding a stage with downlight, as this requires the least amount of control of the beam.  However, fresnel lanterns are more frequently used for this task. Most scoops use a PS52 mogul screw (E39) incandescent lamp.

See also 
 Stage lighting instrument

Stage lighting instruments